BIAM Foundation or Bangladesh Institute of Administration and Management is an autonomous state business institute in Bangladesh and is located in Dhaka, Bangladesh.This is an autonomous training and research institute that is affiliated to Ministry of Public Administration and conducts training ranging from Foundation Training Course (FTC) for Bangladesh Civil Service (BCS) cadre officer to departmental training for other government organisations. It also conducts customized training for private organisations. It has modern hostel facility located at Hatirjheel area. It has auditorium facilities for rent.

History
Bangladesh Institute of Administration and Management was established in 1991. Since 2000, the foundation has established 17 BIAM Laboratory Schools and three BIAM Model School and College. In November 2002, the government of Bangladesh converted the institute into the BIAM Foundation with the help of a resolution. It became self financed and is associated with Bangladesh Administrative Service Association.

References

1991 establishments in Bangladesh
Educational institutions established in 1991
Organisations based in Dhaka
Research institutes in Bangladesh
Universities and colleges in Dhaka